Antioch is an unincorporated community in Polk County, in the U.S. state of Georgia.

History
The community took its name from the Antioch Baptist Church, founded there in the 1840s.

References

Unincorporated communities in Polk County, Georgia
Unincorporated communities in Georgia (U.S. state)